Martigan Belt: An Adventure in the Asteroids is a 1981 role-playing game adventure for Space Opera published by Fantasy Games Unlimited.

Contents
Martigan Belt is an adventure that focuses on Martigan III, the primary world of the system.

Reception
William A. Barton reviewed Martigan Belt in The Space Gamer No. 45. Barton commented that "Overall, Martigan Belt is just a bit slim and lacking in completeness for its price. It's not as useful as it could have been, though it might still prove helpful for a starmaster just beginning the complex feat of constructing a Space Opera universe for his players."

References

Role-playing game supplements introduced in 1981
Space Opera adventures